Petnjica is a village in the municipality of Šavnik, Montenegro. The village is inhabited exclusively by the Karadžić families.

Demographics
According to the 2011 census, its population was 26, all but 5 of them Serbs.

Notable people
Radovan Karadžić, first president of Republika Srpska and convicted war criminal
Joksim Karadžić, grandfather of Vuk Stefanović Karadžić
Milovan Mimov, captain
Tomislav Karadžić, president of Serbian Football Association

References

Populated places in Šavnik Municipality